The 1926–27 Illinois Fighting Illini men's basketball team represented the University of Illinois.

Regular season
Craig Ruby entered his fifth season as head coach of the Fighting Illini. This team returned only five letterman from a team that placed in a tie for fifth place in the Big Ten a year earlier. Slightly improved, the team finished with an overall record of 10 wins and 7 losses. In the conference they finished with 7 wins and 5 losses. The starting lineup included captain Russell Daugherity at forward, Ernest Dorn and Robert Greene rotating at the other forward slot, Robert McKay and K.L. Reynolds at guard, and F.H. Lindsay at center.

Roster

Source

Schedule

|-	
!colspan=12 style="background:#DF4E38; color:white;"| Non-Conference regular season
|- align="center" bgcolor=""

	

|-	
!colspan=9 style="background:#DF4E38; color:#FFFFFF;"|Big Ten regular season

Bold Italic connotes conference game
												
Source

Awards and honors

References

Illinois Fighting Illini
Illinois Fighting Illini men's basketball seasons
Illinois Fighting Illini
Illinois Fighting Illini